East Earl is an unincorporated community and census-designated place (CDP) in East Earl Township, Lancaster County, Pennsylvania, United States. As of the 2010 census it had a population of 1,144.

Geography
East Earl is in northeastern Lancaster County, in the south-central part of East Earl Township. It is bordered to the northwest by Blue Ball. U.S. Route 322 (Division Highway) passes through East Earl, leading northwest  to Ephrata and southeast  to Downingtown. Pennsylvania Route 897 (Springville Road) leads south  to Gap and north  to Swartzville.

The community drains northeast and northwest to the Conestoga River and southwest to Mill Creek, a tributary of the Conestoga.

Demographics

References

Census-designated places in Lancaster County, Pennsylvania
Census-designated places in Pennsylvania